KZNX (1530 AM) is a radio station, licensed to Creedmoor, Texas, and serving the Austin-Round Rock metropolitan area. The station is under ownership of America Telecommunications Group, Inc. It airs a Spanish-language Regional Mexican format. Religious hosts pay the station a fee for airing their programs on KZNX, during which they may ask for donations to their ministry. The transmitter is off Dale Overton Road in the Thoroughbred Estates neighborhood of Del Valle, Texas.

KZNX is also heard on translator station K236AY at 95.1 MHz in West Lake Hills, Texas. KZNX 1530 AM and translator station K236AY 95.1 FM are currently being operated and managed by La Palabra Radio. KZNX is powered at 10,000 watts by day. But because AM 1530 is a clear channel frequency reserved for Class A WCKY in Cincinnati and KFBK in Sacramento, KZNX must significantly reduce power during critical hours and at night.

History
The station first signed on the air on December 8, 1962, as KGTN. Its original city of license was Georgetown, Texas, and it was owned by the Georgetown Broadcasting Company. It began as a 1,000 watt daytimer, required to go off the air at night.

In 1991, KGTN became KOPY with a Christian format, owned by state representative Dan Kubiak. Two years later, the Lower Colorado River Authority acquired KOPY; the public utility's acquisition of the radio station, which had previously gone silent, came in the wake of 1991 floods in the region that required more timely dissemination of information than the region's weekly newspapers and coverage-limited radio stations could provide. Under LCRA's ownership, 1530 returned to the air in March 1995 as KWTR, running automated weather and river information and later including additional community information.

Public response to KWTR was "fairly good", but the river authority ultimately decided that working with the National Weather Service was more cost-effective, and in April 1997, KWTR gave way to "K-News", an all-news radio station owned by Yellow Rose Communications alongside 92.1 KIKY (now KYLR) LCRA sold the station for $632,000; new KNEZ call letters were instituted in April 1997.

KNEZ did not last long; in 1998, the station became KQQA, a simulcast of KQQQ (the former KIKY). The two stations aired a Regional Mexican format known as La Nueva. Yellow Rose sold KQQA in 2004 to Simmons Media Group, which flipped the frequency to sports as KZNX. Border Media Partners bought the station in 2010 and sold it two years later to America Telecommunications Group, a company 25 percent owned by José Pérez Ramírez of Mexican station group Promomedios.

Translators

References

External links
 La Palabra Radio Facebook
 FCC History Cards for KZNX

ZNX
Radio stations established in 1962
1962 establishments in Texas